Crotalus cerastes, known as the sidewinder, horned rattlesnake or sidewinder rattlesnake, is a pit viper species belonging to the genus Crotalus (the rattlesnakes), and is found in the desert regions of the Southwestern United States and northwestern Mexico. Like all other pit vipers, it is venomous. Three subspecies are currently recognized.

Description
The females are larger than the males, which is unusual for this group of snakes.

Usually, 21 rows of keeled dorsal scales occur midbody. Males have 141 or fewer ventral scales; females have 144 or fewer. It is sometimes referred to as the horned rattlesnake because of the raised supraocular scales above its eyes. This adaptation may help shade the eyes or prevent sand drifting over them as the snake lies almost buried in it.

The color pattern consists of a ground color that may be cream, buff, yellowish-brown, pink, or ash gray, overlaid with 28–47 dorsal blotches subrhombic or subelliptical in shape. In the nominate subspecies, the belly is white and the proximal lobe of the rattle is brown in adults. Klauber and Neill describe the ability of this species to display different coloration depending on the temperature—a process known as metachrosis.

Common names
Common names include sidewinder, horned rattlesnake, sidewinder rattlesnake, Mojave Desert sidewinder (for C. c. cerastes), and sidewinder rattler.

Geographic range
In the Southwestern United States, this species is found in the desert region of southeastern California, southern Nevada, southwestern Utah, and western Arizona. In northwestern Mexico, it is found in western Sonora and eastern Baja California.

Conservation status
This species is classified as least concern on the  IUCN Red List (v3.1, 2001). Species are listed as such due to their wide distribution, presumed large population, or because they are unlikely to be declining fast enough to qualify for listing in a more threatened category. The population trend was stable when assessed in 2007.

Behavior
 
The common name sidewinder alludes to its unusual form of locomotion, which is thought to give it traction on windblown desert sand, but this peculiar locomotor specialization is used on any substrate over which the sidewinder can move rapidly. As its body progresses over loose sand, it forms a letter J-shaped impression, with the tip of the hook pointing in the direction of travel. Sidewinding is also the primary mode of locomotion in other desert sand dwellers, such as the horned adder (Bitis caudalis) and Peringuey's adder (Bitis peringueyi), but many other snakes can assume this form of locomotion when on slick substrates (e.g., mud flats). Sidewinder rattlesnakes can use sidewinding to ascend sandy slopes by increasing the portion of the body in contact with the sand to match the reduced yielding force of the inclined sand, allowing them to ascend up to the maximum possible sand slope without slip.  In cybernetics, incorporating this control scheme into a snakebot can enable the robot to replicate sidewinding movement.

The species is nocturnal during hot months and diurnal during the cooler months of its activity period, which is roughly from November to March (probably longer in the southern part of its range).

Juveniles use their tails to attract lizard prey, a behavior termed "caudal luring". Adults lose this behavior as they make the transition from lizard prey to their primary diet of desert rodents, birds, and other snakes. Sidewinder juveniles appear to mimic both life stages of lepidopterans in their luring motions. Their fast luring motions resemble the fluttering of a moth, and their slower tail movements resemble a caterpillar. Both movements have been observed to attract prey lizards.

Neonatal sidewinders engage in a remarkable behavioral homeothermy that has not been observed in any other type of snake. Following birth, the neonates mass together in their natal burrow. Most often, gravid females select an east-facing, small-diameter rodent burrow for giving birth. For the first week or so of their lives, neonatal sidewinders plug the entrance to this burrow during daylight hours, forming a dynamic multiple-individual mass that takes advantage of the hot exterior environment and the cool interior of the burrow to maintain an average aggregate temperature of 32 °C (the optimal temperature for shedding). The dynamic mass of neonates modifies the thermal environment at the burrow entrance such that the young can occupy a location that would ordinarily become lethally hot for an individual neonate (or even an adult). Because of the constant movements of the neonates, the aggregate assumes stable temperature properties reminiscent of a homeothermic organism (i.e., maintains tight temperature tolerance ± 2 °C).

Reproduction
Females produce up to 18 young, with an average of about 10 per litter. Like most other viperids, the young are born enveloped in thin embryonic membranes, from which they emerge shortly after being expelled from the mother. The young stay with their mother in a burrow for 7–10 days, shed for the first time, then leave their natal burrow. During this time, the mother is thought to guard and protect them from predators.

Sidewinders mature at 2–3 years of age, are capable of reproducing annually, and give birth to live young. Some females skip reproductive opportunities. Some might even skip two years if the food supply is scarce. Sidewinders mate in April through May and sometimes in fall. When the male and female mate, the male snake crawls along the female's back, rubbing her with his chin to stimulate or arouse her. The male then will wrap his tail around her tail, and then will try to bring their cloacae together. The cloaca is the posterior body opening through which snakes both excrete waste and reproduce. If the female wants to mate, she lifts her tail and allows him to mate with her. The snakes can mate for several hours, and if one of the snakes decides to move, the other is dragged along. Females might mate with several males in a season. Females give birth to five to 18 young in late summer to early fall. The young are born 6-8 inches long. The birth takes only 2–3 hours altogether. Within a few minutes of being born, the newborn sidewinder escapes from a thin, transparent membrane. The young stay at their natal burrow for 7–10 days until they shed, and then they disappear and have no future contact with their mother or their littermates. While the density of sidewinders can be up to one individual per hectare, they rarely encounter each other except during mating season.

Sidewinders have an extraordinarily accelerated lifecycle, with natural life expectancies of females of about 5 years. Males may live quite a bit longer (maximum known natural lifespan of 13 years). Sidewinders can live more than 20 years when well fed in captivity (even females). Thus, energetics apparently factor heavily into natural female mortality, whereas predation might be the primary pressure on males. In the wild, females often die of exhaustion after giving birth, but the lives of sidewinders are also cut short by predation, diseases, and vehicle encounters.

Venom
These snakes are venomous, but possess a weaker venom than many other rattlesnakes. This, together with the smaller size of their venom glands, makes them less dangerous than their larger relatives. Regardless, any rattlesnake bite can be fatal and should be taken seriously and medical attention sought immediately.

Norris (2004) lists these venom yields: 33 mg average and 63 mg maximum (Klauber, 1956), and 30 mg average and 80 mg maximum (Glenn & Straight, 1982). Brown (1973) gives a venom yield of 33 mg (Klauber, 1956) and  values for mice of 2.6 mg/kg IV, 3.0, 4.0, 2.3 mg/kg IP and 5.5 mg/kg SC for toxicity. With these figures, Brown calculated that the LD50 for an adult human being weighing 70 kg would be 385 mg (SC).

Envenomation can cause pain, swelling, hemorrhagic bleb formation, and ecchymosis (i.e., bruising). Swelling, while not particularly severe, occasionally may involve entire limbs and the trunk. Envenomation's systemic symptoms include nausea, dizziness, chills, coagulopathy (blood disorders), and shock. Klauber (1997) includes an account of a man who had been bitten on the first joint of the index finger of the right hand, with only a single fang penetrating. Although the bite was described as no more painful than a pin prick, a doctor was seen within about 25 minutes, and 10 cm3 of antivenin were administered. Within 2.5 hours, his entire arm was swollen and the pain was severe, "as if the arm were soaked in a bucket of boiling oil."

Ovine-derived antivenom, CroFab, for North American pit viper envenomation, has been widely available since 2001. Consultation with a local expert or regional poison control center should be obtained before administering antivenom. The previous antivenin (ACP) is no longer manufactured.

Subspecies

References

Further reading
 Hallowell, E. Descriptions of new Reptiles from California. Proc. Acad. Nat. Sci. Philadelphia 7: 91–97.

External links

 
 Crotalus cerastes cerastes at California Reptiles and Amphibians. Accessed 5 February 2007.
 Crotalus cerastes at WildHerps. Accessed 5 February 2007.
 The Sidewinder at VenomousReptiles.org. Accessed 5 February 2007.
 Mojave Desert Sidewinder at Bird and Hike . com. Accessed 5 February 2007.

cerastes
Reptiles of the United States
Fauna of the Western United States
Fauna of the Mojave Desert
Fauna of the Colorado Desert
Taxa named by Edward Hallowell (herpetologist)
Reptiles described in 1854